Iupati is a Polynesian surname. Notable people with the surname include:

Loimata Iupati, Tokelauan educator and Bible translator
Mike Iupati (born 1987), American Samoan player of American football

Surnames of Oceanian origin